Sıtma is a village in the Laçin District of Çorum Province in Turkey. Its population is 51 (2022). The village is populated by  Kurds.

References

Villages in Laçin District
Kurdish settlements in Çorum Province